Hugh Geoghegan is an Irish former footballer who played as a forward.

He began his career at Home Farm  and signed for Shamrock Rovers in 1956 and played in 2  European Champion Clubs' Cup games against OGC Nice.

He made his debut, scoring twice, on 28 October 1956 in a League of Ireland Shield game .

Signed for Waterford United in July 1960.

Moved to Jacobs in February 1963.

Honours
League of Ireland: 3
  Shamrock Rovers - 1956/57, 1958/59
League of Ireland Shield: 1
  Shamrock Rovers - 1956/57
Leinster Senior Cup: 3
  Shamrock Rovers - 1956, 1957, 1958
Dublin City Cup: 3
  Shamrock Rovers - 1956/57, 1957/58, 1959/60
Top Four Cup: 1
  Shamrock Rovers - 1957/58

Sources
 The Hoops by Paul Doolan and Robert Goggins

Republic of Ireland association footballers
Shamrock Rovers F.C. players
Home Farm F.C. players
Waterford F.C. players
League of Ireland players
Possibly living people
Year of birth missing
20th-century births
Association footballers not categorized by position